The Congressional Blockchain Caucus is a bipartisan group of U.S. Representatives and staff. The caucus was founded during the 114th United States Congress to be a platform for industry and government to study and understand blockchain technology, and the role Congress can play in its development.

History
The Congressional Blockchain Caucus was formed in September 26, 2016, to study blockchain technology. The Congressional Blockchain Caucus was formed by Jared Polis, a Democratic congressman from Colorado, and Mick Mulvaney, a Republican representing South Carolina.

On March 24, 2019, seven congressmen sent a letter to Larry Kudlow, the director of the National Economic Council. The letter requested that the administration have a forum on blockchain technology and initiate blockchain technology. The signers of the letter were congressmen Trey Hollingsworth, Darren Soto, Bill Foster, Tom Emmer, Ted Budd, Josh Gottheimer and David Schweikert.

In March 2021, Representatives Darren Soto (D-FL) and Warren Davidson (R-OH) reintroduced the Token Taxonomy Act. The bill's co-sponsors are Ted Budd (R-NC), Scott Perry (R-PA) and Josh Gottheimer (D-NJ).

In a press release dated June 16, 2021, Congresswoman Maxine Waters, chairwoman of the U.S. House Committee on Financial Services, announced the formation of a Digital Assets Working Group for Democratic members of Congress. Bill Foster (D-IL), who is Chair of the Task Force on Artificial Intelligence and a co-founder of the Congressional Blockchain Group, is a member of this new Digital Assets Working Group. The Congressional Blockchain Caucus focuses on cryptocurrency policy.

Purpose
The caucus was formed to be a platform for industry and government to study and understand blockchain technology.

Co-Chairs
Tom Emmer, (R-Minn)
David Schweikert, (R-Ariz.)
Darren Soto, (D-Fla.)
Bill Foster (politician) (D-Ill.).

Members
Congressman Ted Budd
Congressman Troy Carter
Congressman Jim Cooper
Congressman John Curtis
Congressman Warren Davidson
Congressman Jeff Duncan
Congressman Matt Gaetz
Congressman Greg Gianforte
Representative Anthony Gonzalez
Congressman Josh Gottheimer
Congressman Denny Heck
Congressman Bill Huizenga
Congressman Ro Khanna
Congressman Raja Krishnamoorthi
Congressman John Larson
Congressman Dan Lipinski
Congressman Frank Lucas
Congressman Stephen F. Lynch
Congresswoman Nancy Mace
Congressman Jerry McNerney
Congresswoman Marie Newman
Congressman Ralph Norman
Congresswoman Stacey Plaskett
Congressman Bryan Steil
Congressman Van Taylor
Congressman Glenn Thompson
Congressman Michael Waltz
Congressman Rob Wittman

See also
CBSCs by country

References

 
Issue-based groups of legislators